Boa Vista FM is a radio station broadcasting on 96.5 FM, serving Paracatu, Minas Gerais and parts of western Minas Gerais in Brazil.  The station is a mixture of variety, Top 40, pop, country and romance music.

External links
Official website 
Technical information for this station from ANATEL

Radio stations in Brazil
Portuguese-language radio stations
Minas Gerais